Steve Pink (born February 3, 1966) is an American actor, director and writer. He is the director of the comedy films Accepted  and Hot Tub Time Machine, and the co-writer of the films Grosse Pointe Blank and High Fidelity.

Life and career
He is an alumnus of Evanston Township High School, Columbia College Chicago, and University of California-Berkeley (graduating in 1989 with a degree in Peace and Conflict Studies), and a contemporary of John Cusack, Jeremy Piven, and D.V. DeVincentis. Together, Pink, Cusack and DeVincentis formed a production company, New Crime Productions, which produced both Grosse Pointe Blank and High Fidelity.

In 2010, he directed Hot Tub Time Machine, and its sequel Hot Tub Time Machine 2 in 2015. He was also a producer on the 20th Century Fox release  Knight and Day, starring Tom Cruise and Cameron Diaz.

Filmography

Acting credits

References

External links

1966 births
American film directors
American male film actors
American male screenwriters
Evanston Township High School alumni
Living people
Male actors from Illinois